Fred Shaw may refer to:

Dupee Shaw (1859–1938), American Major League Baseball player
Fred Shaw (footballer) (1909–1994), English footballer
Fred Shaw (American football), Arena Football League player
Fred Shaw (socialist activist) (1881-1951), British socialist activist and trade unionist

See also
Frederick Shaw (disambiguation)
Alfred Shaw (disambiguation)